Dignam is a surname. Notable people with the surname include: 

Basil Dignam (1905–1979), English character actor
Mark Dignam (1909–1989), English actor, brother of Basil
Arthur Dignam (1939-2020), Australian actor
Christy Dignam (born 1960), lead singer of the Irish rock band Aslan

Dignam, fictional character in the book, Ulysses, by James Joyce.  The plot revolves in large part about traveling to his funeral.

Fictional people
Sean Dignam, character in the 2006 American crime thriller film The Departed